Éhein is a village of Wallonia and a district of the municipality of Neupré, located in the province of Liège, Belgium.

It was a municipality until the fusion of the Belgian municipalities in 1977.

Caves
The rock has many caves, the best-known of which are the Lyell Cave and the Rosée Cave. Early explorations of the caves were done by Philippe-Charles Schmerling starting in 1829. Subsequent researchers, including Ernest Doudou, have proven that the area was inhabited since the Paleolithic.

Gallery

Former municipalities of Liège Province
Neanderthal sites